Numerous castles are found in the German state of Schleswig-Holstein. These buildings, some of which have a history of over 1000 years, were the setting of historical events, domains of famous personalities and are still imposing buildings to this day.

This list encompasses castles described in German as Burg (castle), Festung (fort/fortress), Schloss (manor house) and Palais/Palast (palace). Many German castles after the middle ages were mainly built as royal or ducal palaces rather than as a fortified building.

Kiel
Kiel Castle
Adliges Gut Seekamp in Kiel-Schilksee

Kreis Dithmarschen
die ehemalige Steller Burg in Stelle-Wittenwurth
Adliges Gut Friedrichshof in Dingen

Kreis Herzogtum Lauenburg
Lauenburger Schloss
Gut Basthorst
Herrenhaus in Gudow
Gut Gülzow in Gülzow (Lauenburg)
Adliges Gut Wotersen in Roseburg
Gut Steinhorst in Steinhorst
Gut Kogel in Sterley
Herrenhaus in Ratzeburg

Lübeck
Schloss Rantzau
die ehemalige slawische Burg Bucu
die Lübecker Burg (beim Burgtor)
Liubice
Stülper Huk
der Pöppendorfer Ringwall (Fluchtburg)
die Landwehr, weitenteils als Landgraben
das Holstentor
das Mühlentor
Gut Brandenbaum
Gut Dänischburg
Gut Dummersdorf
Gut Falkenhusen
Gut Groß Steinrade
Gut Israelsdorf
Gut Karlshof
Gut Klein Steinrade
Gut Krempelsdorf
Gut Krummesse
Gut Lauerhof
Gut Mönkhof
Gut Moisling
Gut Mori
Gut Niemark
Gut Niendorf
Gut Padelügge
Gut Roggenhorst
Gut Schönböken
Gut Strecknitz
Gut Wesloe

Neumünster
Wittorfer Burg in Neumünster
Margarethenschanze in Neumünster-Einfeld
Adliges Gut Neumünster

Kreis Nordfriesland
Schloss vor Husum
Lembecksburg bei Borgsum auf Föhr
Tinnumburg in Sylt-Ost
Gut Fresenhagen in Fresenhagen
Gut Gaarde in Sprakebüll
Gut Hogelund in Sprakebüll
Herrenhaus Hoyerswort in Oldenswort
Adliges Gut Immenstedt in Immenstedt (Nordfriesland)
Adliges Gut Karrhardehof in Klixbüll
Adliges Gut Klixbüllhof in Klixbüll
Adliges Gut Lütjenhorn in Achtrup
Adliges Gut Mirebüll in Bredstedt (?)
Adliges Gut Seegaarden auf Pellworm

Kreis Ostholstein
Eutiner Schloss
Jagdschlösschen am Ukleisee in Eutin
Schloß Weissenhaus
Burg Glambek in Burg auf Fehmarn
Hasselburg in Altenkrempe
Wittenwiewerbarg in Dahme

Kreis Pinneberg
Hetlinger Schanze
Langes Tannen (Uetersen)
Gut Brodau bei Neustadt in Holstein
Gut Bürau in Neukirchen (Ostholstein)
Adliges Gut Farve in Wangels
Gut Friederikenhof in Wangels
Gut Gaarz in Oldenburg in Holstein
Gut Godderstorf in Neukirchen (Ostholstein)
Gut Görtz in Heringsdorf (Ostholstein)
Gut Güldenstein in Harmsdorf (Ostholstein)
Gut Hasselburg in Altenkrempe
Hof Kiekbusch in Bosau
Gut Löhrstorf in Neukirchen (Ostholstein)
Gut Manhagen in Manhagen
Gut Mönchneversdorf in Schönwalde am Bungsberg
Gut Petersdorf in Lensahn
Gut Putlos in Oldenburg in Holstein
Hof Redingsdorf in Süsel
Gut Satjewitz in Neukirchen (Ostholstein)
Gut Sebent in Damlos
Gut Seekamp in Neukirchen (Ostholstein)
Gut Sierhagen in Altenkrempe
Gut Siggen in Heringsdorf (Ostholstein)
Gut Stendorf in Kasseedorf
Gut Testorf in Wangels
Gut Weißenhaus in Wangels

Kreis Rendsburg-Eckernförde
ehemalige Burg Hanerau in Hanerau-Hademarschen
Königsburg in Kosel
ehemalige Schwonsburg in Winnemark
Adliges Gut Alt-Bülk in Strande
Adliges Gut Altenhof in Altenhof (bei Eckernförde)
Gut Augustenhof in Osdorf
Adliges Gut Bienebek in Thumby
Adliges Gut Birkenmoor in Schwedeneck
Adliges Gut Borghorst in Osdorf
Adliges Gut Büstorf in Rieseby
Adliges Gut Damp in  Damp
Adliges Gut Dänisch-Nienhof in Schwedeneck
Gut Dengelsberg in Bovenau
Gut Deutsch-Nienhof in Westensee
Adliges Gut Dörphof in Dörphof
Gut Eckhof in Dänischenhagen
Gut Emkendorf in Emkendorf
Adliges Gut Eschelsmark in Kosel
Gut Georgenthal in Bovenau
Adliges Gut Gereby (Karlsburg) in Winnemark
Gut Groß Nordsee in Krummwisch
Adliges Gut Hemmelmark in Barkelsby
Gut Hohenschulen in Achterwehr
Adliges Gut Hohenstein in Barkelsby
Gut Hütten in Hütten (Schleswig)
Adliges Gut Kaltenhof in Dänischenhagen
Gut Karlsminde in Waabs
Gut Karlsburg in Winnemark
Gut Klein Königsförde in Krummwisch
Adliges Gut Klein Nordsee in Felde
Gut Kluvensiek in Bovenau
Gut Knoop in Altenholz
Adliges Gut Krieseby in Thumby
Gut Lindhöft in Noer
Adliges Gut Louisenlund in Güby
Adliges Gut Ludwigsburg in Waabs
Adliges Gut Maasleben in Holzdorf
Adliges Gut Marienthal in Eckernförde
Gut Marutenhof in Achterwehr
Gut Neu Bülk in Strande
Adliges Gut (Schloss) Noer
Adliges Gut Ornum in Kosel
Gut Osterrade in Bovenau
Gut Projensdorf in Altenholz
Gut Quarnbek in Quarnbek
Adliges Gut Rathmannsdorf in Felm
Adliges Gut Rögen in Barkelsby
Adliges Gut Rosenkranz in Schinkel (Gemeinde)
Adliges Gut Saxdorf in Waabs
Gut Schierensee in Schierensee
Adliges Gut Schirnau in Bünsdorf
Gut Schönhagen in Brodersby (Schwansen)
Gut Sehestedt in Sehestedt
Adliges Gut Staun in Thumby
Gut Steinwehr in Bovenau
Gut Warleberg in Neuwittenbek
Adliges Gut Windeby in Eckernförde
Adliges Gut Wulfshagen in Tüttendorf
Gut Neubarkelsby in Barkelsby Barkelsby

Kreis Schleswig-Flensburg
Gottorp in Schleswig
Burg Böge-Schloss in Ausacker
Burg in Brodersby (Angeln)
Danewerk (mostly in Dannewerk. Margarethenwall in Brodersby and Waldemarsmauer in Dannewerk are parts of the same structure)
Burg Hesselgaard in Ulsnis
Holmer Schanze in Wohlde
Schloss Glücksburg in Glücksburg
Adliges Gut Böelschubyhof in Böel
Adliges Gut Buckhagen in Rabel
Adliges Gut Dänisch Lindau in Boren
Adliges Gut Dollrott in Dollrottfeld
Gut Drült in Stoltebüll
Adliges Gut Düttebüll in Kronsgaard
Adliges Gut Fahrenstedt in Böklund
Gut Falkenberg in Lürschau
Adliges Gut Flarupgaard in Saustrup
Adliges Gut Freienwillen in Langballig
Adliges Gut Gelting in Gelting
Gut Grödersby in Grödersby
Adliges Gut Grünholz in Sterup
Adliges Gut Loitmark in Kappeln
Adliges Gut Lundsgaard in Grundhof
Gut Mohrkirchen in Mohrkirch (ehemals Kloster Mohrkirchen)
Adliges Gut Oestergaard in Steinberg
Adliges Gut Ohrfeld in Niesgrau
Gut Olpenitz in Kappeln
Gut Priesholz in Rabenholz
Adliges Gut Roest bei Kappeln
Adliges Gut Rundhof in Stangheck
Ehemaliges Adliges Gut Satrupholm in Satrup
Gut Saxtorf in Rieseby
Adliges Gut Stubbe in Rieseby
Adliges Gut Toesdorf in Oersberg
Kanzleigut Tolkschuby in Tolk
Gut Winningen in Schaalby

Kreis Segeberg
Traventhal House, a former royal hunting lodge and ducal seat in Traventhal
Siegesburg in Bad Segeberg
Motte in Bimöhlen
Gut Alt-Erfrade in Tarbek
Gut Bahrenhof in Bahrenhof
Adliges Gut Bramstedt (Schloss) in Bad Bramstedt
Gut Borstel in Sülfeld
Gut Glasau in Glasau
Gut Kaden in Alveslohe
Gut Kamp in Travenhorst
ehemaliges Staatsgut Pettluis in Daldorf
Gut Rohlstorf in Rohlstorf
Gut Seedorf in Seedorf (Kreis Segeberg)
Gut Springhirsch in Nützen
Adliges Gut Stockseehof in Stocksee
Gut Wensin in Wensin

Kreis Steinburg
Schloss Breitenburg in Itzehoe
Schloss Wallberg in Willenscharen
Schloss Friedrichsruhe in Drage (Steinburg) (1787 abgebrochen)
Schloss Heiligenstedten in Heiligenstedten
Kaaksburg in Kaaks
Eselsfeldburg in Heiligenstedten
Gut Drage in Drage (Steinburg)
Gut Hohenlockstedt in Hohenlockstedt
Gut Kleve in Kleve
Gut Krummendiek in Kleve
Gut Mehlbek in Mehlbek
Gut Springhoe in Lockstedt

Kreis Pinneberg
Schlossinsel Barmstedt, Barmstedt
Drostei (Pinneberg)
Herrenhaus Haseldorf

Kreis Plön
ehemaliges Jagdschloss Blomenburg in Selent
Schloss Plön

Gut (Schloss) Ascheberg in Ascheberg (Holstein)
Gut Bockhorn in Ruhwinkel
Gut Bothkamp in Bothkamp
Gut Bredeneek in Lehmkuhlen
Gut Bundhorst in Stolpe (Holstein)
Gut Depenau in Stolpe (Holstein)
Adliges Gut Dobersdorf in Dobersdorf
Gut Friedburg in Lammershagen
Gut Großrolübbe in Kletkamp
Gut Güsdorf in Wittmoldt
Adliges Gut Hagen in Probsteierhagen
Gut Helmstorf in Helmstorf
Gut Hohenhof in Rantzau
Gut Hohensasel in Rantzau
Gut Horst in Stolpe (Holstein)
Gut Kletkamp in Kletkamp
Gut Lammershagen in Lammershagen
Gut Löhndorf in Wankendorf
Gut Neudorf in Hohwacht (Ostsee)
Gut Neuhaus in Giekau
Adliges Gut Panker in Panker
Gut Perdoel in Belau
Gut Rantzau in Rantzau
Gut Rastorf in Rastorf
Gut Rixdorf in Lebrade
Gut Ruhleben in Bösdorf (Holstein)
Gut Salzau in Fargau-Pratjau
Gut Schmoel in Schwartbuck
Gut Schönböken in Ruhwinkel
Gut Wahlstorf in Wahlstorf (Holstein)
Gut Waterneverstorff in Behrensdorf (Ostsee)
Gut Wittenberg in Martensrade
Gut Wittmoldt in Wittmoldt

Kreis Stormarn
Adliges Schloss Reinbek in Reinbek
Adliges Schloss in Reinfeld (abgerissen)
Herzögliches Schloss Rethwisch in Rethwisch (Stormarn)
Schloss Ahrensburg in Ahrensburg
Adliges Gut Altfresenburg in Bad Oldesloe
Adliges Gut Blumendorf in Bad Oldesloe
Gut Frauenholz in Rethwisch (Stormarn)
Adliges Gut Grabau in Grabau
Adliges Gut Hohenholz in Pölitz
Adliges Gut Höltenklinken in Rümpel
Park und Gut Jersbek in Jersbek
Adliges Gut Krummbek in Lasbek
Gut Mönkhagen in Mönkhagen
Gut Neverstaven in Travenbrück
Adliges Gut Nütschau in Travenbrück
Gut Rethwischhof in Rethwisch (Stormarn)
Adliges Gut Rohlfshagen in Rümpel
Adliges Gut Schulenburg in Pölitz
Adliges Gut Tralau in Travenbrück
Adliges Gut Tremsbüttel in Tremsbüttel
Adliges Gut Trenthorst und Wulmenau in Westerau
Gut Treuholz in Rethwisch (Stormarn)
Adliges Gut Wulfsdorf in Ahrensburg

See also
List of castles
List of castles in Germany

External links
Wehrbauten und Schlösser in Schleswig-Holstein

 
Cast
Schleswig-Holstein